The New Zealand outlying islands are nine offshore island groups that are part of New Zealand, with all but Solander Islands lying beyond the 12nm limit of the mainland's territorial waters. Although considered an integral parts of New Zealand, seven of the nine island groups are not part of any administrative region or district, but are instead each designated as an Area Outside Territorial Authority. The two exceptions are the Chatham Islands, which are covered by their own special territorial authority, and the Solander Islands, which are part of the Southland Region and Southland District.

Eight island groups sit on the New Zealand continental shelf, which forms a part of Zealandia. The Kermadec Islands, northeast of mainland New Zealand, are on a ridge, whose location as part or not part of Zealandia is not yet proven by geologists. Both sources show a map drawn of Zealandia, marking the location of islands north and south of New Zealand.

The term is also used sometimes to further encompass the Balleny Islands, a group of sub-Antarctic islands technically considered a part of the Ross Dependency and covered by the Antarctic Treaty.

The five island groups of the New Zealand Subantarctic Islands, including their territorial seas, are a World Heritage Site.

Island groups
The nine island groups classed as part of New Zealand's outlying islands are:

Population 
The islands are all uninhabited except the Chatham Islands.

There is a staffed meteorological station on Raoul Island of the Kermadec Islands. The meteorological station on Campbell Island has been unstaffed and automated since 1995. There was a meteorological station on the Auckland Islands from 1942 to 1945. The Three Kings Islands and the Auckland Islands were formerly inhabited. There have been failed settlement attempts on Raoul Island, the Antipodes Islands and the Auckland Islands. The Solander Islands have never been inhabited except by shipwrecked sailors or marooned stowaways (for the longest period, from 1808 to 1813 by five European stowaways).

See also 
 List of Antarctic and subantarctic islands
 List of islands of New Zealand
 New Zealand Subantarctic Islands
 Outlying Islands, Hong Kong
 United States Minor Outlying Islands

References

External links
 New Zealand Subantarctic Islands

 
Outlying Islands
 
Islands of the Pacific Ocean
Islands of the Southern Ocean